American Century was a comic book series published by DC Comics as a part of the Vertigo imprint starting in early 2001. It was co-written by Howard Chaykin and David Tischman.

The story concerned a former American pilot who fakes his death and goes on the run in the 1950s. Chaykin intended it as a "left-wing version of Steve Canyon", and wrote all of the issues. The comic ran for 27 issues until 2003.

Plot
Harry Block, a World War II veteran, fakes his own death and makes his way to Central America to create a new identity for himself as Harry Kraft, a hard-drinking smuggler. During a war in Guatemala, a CIA operative blackmails Block into assassinating Rosa de Santiis, a popular leader in opposition to the CIA puppet dictator General Zavala. Afterward, he heads back to the United States, taking a road trip from Hollywood to Chicago to New York, exploring myriad avenues of 1950s American culture.

The comic ends with Block essentially turning into the character he had created for the fictional "Starburst Comics", a vigilante known as "Dr. Dream".

Collected editions
Some of the series has been collected into two trade paperbacks:
 Scars & Stripes (collects issues #1–4, DC/Vertigo, 2001)
 Hollywood Babylon (collects issues #5–9, DC/Vertigo, 2002)

References

External links

Further reading

2001 comics debuts
Comics by Howard Chaykin
2003 comics endings
Vertigo Comics titles
Crime comics